Stéphane Breton may refer to:

 Stéphane Breton (actor), Canadian actor
 Stéphane Breton (filmmaker) (born 1959), French filmmaker, photographer and anthropologist